Mahmudabad-e Gavkol (also Romanized as Maḩmūdābād-e Gāvkol; also known as Maḩmūdābād) is a village in Gamasiyab Rural District, in the Central District of Sahneh County, Kermanshah Province, Iran. At the 2006 census, its population was 338, in 84 families.

References 

Populated places in Sahneh County